Olfactory white is a smell composed of many equally strong but diverse smells, perhaps over 30.  Mixtures of many different smells across the perceptual range all tend to smell very similar to humans, despite different components making them up.  The concept is similar to all different spectral colours combining to form white. Olfactory white is neither pleasant or malodorous.

References

Olfaction